Emde, van Emde or von der Emde is a surname. Notable people with the surname include:
Don Emde (born 1951), American motorcycle racer, writer and publisher
Hans Georg Emde, German politician
Johannes Emde (1774–1859), German evangelist
Mala Emde (born 1996), German actress

See also
Peter van Emde Boas (born 1945), Dutch computer scientist
Wilhelm von der Emde (1922–2020), German-Austrian civil engineer
Emde degradation